The 8th constituency of the Nord is a French legislative constituency in the Nord département.

Description

Nord's 8th constituency covers three of the four (pre-2015) cantons of the city of Roubaix with only Roubaix Ouest within Nord's 7th constituency.

Despite electing a candidate from the centre right UDF as recently as 2002 the seat appeared to be safe for the left until 2017. Dominique Baert was expelled from the Socialist Party prior to the 2012 election and faced a Green Party (France) candidate backed by the Socialist Party. He was, however, comfortably re-elected with nearly 70% of the vote but on a very low turnout of only 41%.

Historic Representation

Election results

2022

 
 
 
 
 
 
 
 
|-
| colspan="8" bgcolor="#E9E9E9"|
|-

2017

2012

 
 
 
 
 
|-
| colspan="8" bgcolor="#E9E9E9"|
|-

2007

 
 
 
 
 
 
|-
| colspan="8" bgcolor="#E9E9E9"|
|-

2002

 
 
 
 
|-
| colspan="8" bgcolor="#E9E9E9"|
|-

1997

 
 
 
 
 
 
 
 
 
|-
| colspan="8" bgcolor="#E9E9E9"|
|-

Sources
 Official results of French elections from 1998: 

8